Pebble Beach Golf Links is a video game developed by T&E Soft and originally published by Panasonic for the 3DO Interactive Multiplayer.

Gameplay
Pebble Beach Golf Links is a golf game that features guidance from Craig Stadler. Depending on the version, up to six players can play as digitized golfers against one another.

Reception

Next Generation reviewed the Saturn version of the game, rating it three stars out of five, and stated that "This game is definitely meant to show the power of the Saturn and to a certain degree it does, but probably the title is no more than a sign of more impressive things to come."

Reviews
Edge #9
GamePro (Aug, 1995)
Electronic Gaming Monthly (Jul, 1995)
Entertainment Weekly (Jun 09, 1995)

See also
True Golf Classics: Pebble Beach Golf Links

References

1994 video games
3DO Interactive Multiplayer games
Golf video games
Sega video games
Sega Saturn games
Video games developed in Japan